Maine School Administrative District 13 (MSAD 13) is an operating school district within Somerset County Maine, covering the towns of Bingham and Moscow.

References

External links

13
13